Alice Rice may refer to:
 Alice Hegan Rice, American novelist
 Alice May Bates Rice, American soprano